is a trans-Neptunian object from the scattered disc in the outermost reaches of the Solar System, approximately 212 kilometers in diameter. It was discovered on 8 February 2013, by the Outer Solar System Origins Survey at the Mauna Kea Observatories on the island of Hawaii, United States.

Orbit and classification 

 orbits the Sun at a distance of 41.1–268.5 AU once every 1925 years and 4 months (703,239 days). Its orbit has an eccentricity of 0.73 and an inclination of 33° with respect to the ecliptic.

It was mentioned in a 2016 paper by Malhotra of the Lunar and Planetary Laboratory, at The University of Arizona, Tucson, AZ as a detached object with a perihelion greater than 40 AUs, a 6:1 orbital period ratio with 90377 Sedna, and in a possible 9:1 mean-motion resonance with a hypothetical large Planet Nine.

See also 
 List of Solar System objects most distant from the Sun

References

External links 
 OSSOS project
  – Michele Bannister (SETI Talks) 
 2013 GP136 Inner Oort Cloud Object Discovery Images from Scott S. Sheppard/Carnegie Institution for Science.
 Asteroid Lightcurve Database (LCDB), query form (info )
 Asteroids and comets rotation curves, CdR – Observatoire de Genève, Raoul Behrend
 Discovery Circumstances: Numbered Minor Planets (495001)-(500000) – Minor Planet Center
 
 

496315
496315
496315
496315
20130208